RNA, ribosomal 3, also known as RNR3, is a human gene. It is a minor isoform of large subunit of ribonucleotide-diphosphate reductase; the RNR complex catalyzes rate-limiting step in dNTP synthesis, regulated by DNA replication and DNA damage checkpoint pathways via localization of small subunits; RNR3 has a paralog, RNR1, that arose from the whole genome duplication.

References

Further reading

 Nucleolus organizer regions are chromosomal regions crucial for the formation of the nucleolus, located on the short arms of the acrocentric chromosomes 13, 14, 15, 21 and 22

Proteins
Non-coding RNA
RNA
Ribosomal RNA
Ribozymes